The following is the list of games developed and/or published by Shin Nihon Kikaku/SNK/SNK Playmore.

SNK

Arcade
1978
Micon Kit
1979
Yosaku
Ozma Wars
Safari Rally
1980
Sasuke vs. Commander
Atom Smasher
The Monkey/Monkey Friend
1981
Zarzon
Fantasy
Vanguard
1982
Lasso
 Nibbler (borne Rock Olas)
Pioneer Balloon
1983
Joyful Road (Munch Mobile in the US)
Marvin's Maze
Mahjong Classroom
1984
Gladiator 1984
Jumping Cross
Mad Crasher
Main Event
Vanguard II
1985
Alpha Mission (ASO: Armored Scrum Object in Japan)
Canvas Croquis
HAL 21
TNK III
1986
Athena (only the NES version was released in the US)
Ikari Warriors (released in Japan as simply Ikari)
Meijinsen
Victory Road (Dogosoken in Japan; sequel to Ikari Warriors)
1987
Bermuda Triangle
Guerrilla War (Guevara in Japan; after Che Guevara)
Jongbou
Jongbou Sono 2
Psycho Soldier
Touch Down Fever
Time Soldiers
World Wars
1988
Chopper I
Country Club
Fighting Soccer
Gold Medalist
Lee Trevino's Fighting Golf
Paddle Mania
P.O.W.: Prisoners of War
Sky Soldiers
Touchdown Fever 2
1989
Baseball Stars
Beast Busters
Gang Wars
Ikari III: The Rescue
Mechanized Attack
The Next Space
Prehistoric Isle in 1930 (Genshi-Tou 1930's)
SAR: Search and Rescue
Sky Adventure
Street Smart
Super Champion Baseball

Neo Geo, Neo Geo CD & Hyper Neo Geo 64
1990
Baseball Stars Professional
Blue's Journey (Raguy)
Cyber-Lip
League Bowling
Magician Lord
MahJong Kyoretsuden: Higashi Nippon Hen
Mahjong Kyōretsuden: Nishi Nihon Hen
NAM-1975
Puzzled (Joy Joy Kid)
Riding Hero
The Super Spy
Top Player's Golf
1991
Alpha Mission II (ASO II: Last Guardian)
Bakatono-sama Mahjong Manyūki
Burning Fight
Crossed Swords
Eightman
Fatal Fury: King of Fighters (Garou Densetsu: Shukumei no Tatakai)
Ghost Pilots
Great Quiz Detective
King of the Monsters
Legend of Success Joe
Minna-san no Okage-sama Desu! Dai Sugoroku Taikai
Quiz Daisousa Sen: The Last Count Down
Robo Army
Sengoku (Sengoku Denshou)
Soccer Brawl
Super Baseball 2020
Thrash Rally
1992
Andro Dunos
Art of Fighting (Ryuuko no Ken)
Baseball Stars 2
Fatal Fury 2 (Garou Densetsu 2: Arata-naru Tatakai)
Football Frenzy
King of the Monsters 2: The Next Thing
Last Resort
Mutation Nation
Ninja Commando
Quiz Meitantei Neo Geo (Quiz Daisousa Sen Part 2)
Super Sidekicks (Tokuten Ou)
Viewpoint
World Heroes
1993
3 Count Bout (Fire Suplex)
Fatal Fury Special (Garou Densetsu Special)
Samurai Shodown (Samurai Spirits)
Sengoku 2 (Sengoku Denshou 2)
Spinmaster (Miracle Adventure)
World Heroes 2
1994
Aero Fighters 2 (Sonic Wings 2)
Aggressors of Dark Kombat (Tsuukai Gangan Koushinkyoku)
Art of Fighting 2 (Ryuuko no Ken 2)
Fight Fever
Gururin
Janshin Densetsu: Quest of Jongmaster
Karnov's Revenge (Fighter's History Dynamite)
The King of Fighters '94
Power Spikes II
Puzzle Bobble (Bust-A-Move)
Samurai Shodown II (Shin Samurai Spirits: Haohmaru jigokuhen)
Super Sidekicks 2: The World Championship (Tokuten Ou 2: Real Fight Football)
Street Slam (Street Hoop, Dunk Dream)
Top Hunter: Roddy & Cathy
World Heroes 2 Jet
Windjammers
Zed Blade
1995
Aero Fighters 3 (Sonic Wings 3)
Bomberman: Panic Bomber
Chibi Maruko-chan: Maruko Deluxe Quiz
Crossed Swords 2
Double Dragon 
Far East of Eden: Kabuki Klash (Tengai Makyou: Shin Den)
Fatal Fury 3: Road to the Final Victory (Garou Densetsu 3: Haruka-naru Tatakai)
Galaxy Fight: Universal Warriors
Goal! Goal! Goal!
Idol Mahjong Final Romance 2
The King of Fighters '95
Pulstar
Puzzle De Pon
Quiz King of Fighters
Real Bout Fatal Fury (Real Bout Garou Densetsu)
Samurai Shodown III: Blades of Blood (Samurai Spirits: Zankurou Musouken)
Savage Reign (Fu'un Mokushiroku: Kakutou Sousei)
Shōgi no Tatsujin: Master of Syougi
Stakes Winner (Stakes Winner: GI Kinzen Seihae no Michi)
Super Sidekicks 3: The Next Glory (Tokuten Ou 3: Eikoue No Michi)
Taisen Idol-Mahjong Final Romance 2
Voltage Fighter Gowcaizer (Choujin Gakuen Gowcaizer)
World Heroes Perfect
1996
Art of Fighting 3: The Path of the Warrior (Art of Fighting: Ryuuko no Ken Gaiden)
Breakers
Ironclad
The King of Fighters '96
Kizuna Encounter: Super Tag Battle (Fu'un Super Tag Battle)
Magical Drop II
Metal Slug (Metal Slug: Super Vehicle-001)
Neo Drift Out: New Technology
Neo Mr. Do!
Neo Turf Masters (Big Tournament Golf)
Ninja Master's -Haoh-Ninpo-Cho-
Over Top
Pleasure Goal (Futsal: 5 on 5 Mini Soccer)
Ragnagard (Shin-Oh-Ken)
Samurai Shodown IV: Amakusa's Revenge (Samurai Spirits: Amakusa Kourin)
Tecmo World Soccer '96
Twinkle Star Sprites
Super Dodge Ball (Kunio no Nekketsu Toukyuu Densetsu)
The Ultimate 11: SNK Football Championship (Tokuten Ou: Honoo no Libero)
Waku Waku 7
ZinTrick
1997
Real Bout Fatal Fury Special (Real Bout Garou Densetsu Special)
The Irritating Maze
The King of Fighters '97
The Last Blade (Bakumatsu Roman: Gekka no Kenshi)
Money Puzzle Exchanger (Money Idol Exchanger)
Neo Bomberman
Pop'n Bounce
Puzzle De Pon! R!
Road's Edge (Round Trip)
Samurai Shodown 64
Samurai Shodown RPG (Shinsetsu Samurai Spirits Bushidō Retsuden)
Shock Troopers
1998
Battle Flip Shot
Blazing Star
Breakers Revenge
Fatal Fury: Wild Ambition
The King of Fighters '98: The Slugfest (The King of Fighters '98: Dream Match Never Ends)
The Last Blade 2 (Bakumatsu Roman: Dai Ni Maku Gekka no Kenshi)
Metal Slug 2 (Metal Slug 2: Super Vehicle-001/II)
Neo Geo Cup '98: The Road to the Victory
Real Bout Fatal Fury 2: The Newcomers (Real Bout Garou Densetsu 2: The Newcomers)
Samurai Shodown 64: Warriors Rage (Samurai Spirits 2: Asura Zanmaden)
Shock Troopers: 2nd Squad
Off Beat Racer!/Xtreme Rally
1999
Beast Busters: Second Nightmare
Buriki One
Captain Tomaday
Garou: Mark of the Wolves
Ganryu
The King of Fighters '99: Millennium Battle
Metal Slug X (Metal Slug X: Super Vehicle-001)
Prehistoric Isle 2 (Genshi Tou)
Puzzle Bobble 2
Strikers 1945 Plus
2000
Bang Bead
The King of Fighters 2000
Metal Slug 3
Nightmare in the Dark
2001
The King of Fighters 2001
Sengoku 3 (Sengoku Legends 2001)
ZuPaPa!
2002
The King of Fighters 2002: Challenge to Ultimate Battle
Metal Slug 4
Rage of the Dragons
2003
The King of Fighters 2003
Metal Slug 5
Pochi and Nyaa
Power Instinct Matrimelee (Shin Gouketsuji Ichizoku Toukon)
Samurai Shodown V (Samurai Spirits Zero)
SNK vs. Capcom: SVC Chaos
2004
Samurai Shodown V Special (Samurai Spirits Zero Special)

Neo Geo Pocket & Neo Geo Pocket Color
1999
Baseball Stars Color
Biomotor Unitron
Crush Roller
Dark Arms: Beast Busters
Fatal Fury: First Contact
The King of Fighters R-1
The King of Fighters R-2
Magical Drop Pocket
Metal Slug: 1st Mission
Neo Geo Cup '98 Plus Color
Neo Turf Masters
Pocket Tennis Color
Puyo Pop
Puzzle Bobble Mini
Samurai Shodown! 2 (Samurai Spirits! 2)
SNK vs. Capcom: Card Fighters Clash
SNK vs. Capcom: The Match of the Millennium
Sonic the Hedgehog Pocket Adventure
2000
Cotton
The King of Fighters: Battle de Paradise
The Last Blade: Beyond the Destiny
Metal Slug: 2nd Mission
Shanghai Mini
SNK Gals' Fighters
Ballistic
Battle Royal
Big Bang Pro-Wrestling
Bikkuriman 2000
Billiard Break Shot
Biomotor Unitron 2
Bust-A-Move Pocket
Cool Boarders Pocket
Cool Cool Jam
Del Sol 2
Delta Warp
Densha De Go! 2
Digital Primate
Dive Alert
Dynamite Slugger
Evolution: Eternal Dungeons
Faselei!
Ganbare Neo Poke-Kun
Graduation Photograph
Ikari Warriors
Koi Koi Mahjong
The King of Fighters RPG
Magician Lord
Melon Chan's Growth Diary
Melon Chan's Growth Diary 2
Neo 21
Neo Baccarat
Neo Cherry Master Color
Neo Dragon's Wild
Neo Mystery Bonus
Neo Pocket Bass Fishing
NeoGeo Cup '98
Oekaki Puzzle
Ogre Battle Gaiden: Prince of Zenobia
Pachinko Simulation Vol. 1
Party Mail
Pocket Fishing
Pocket Love - If
Pocket Reversi
Popeye and Betty
Puzzle Link
Puzzle Link 2
Puzzle Tsunagete Pon
SNK vs. Capcom: Card Fighters 2 Expand Edition
Sakura Wars (Sakura Taisen)
Sakura Taisen Columns
Samurai Shodown! (Samurai Spirits!)
Shigeru Mizuki's Ghost Photo Gallery
Syougi no Tatsujin (Master of Shogi)
Soccer Manager Simulation
Super Producer
Super Real Mahjong: Premium Collection
Thunder V
Tsunagete Pon! 2
Ward of Lights
World Heroes Pocket
Zero Kichi

Sammy

Atomiswave
2004
The King of Fighters Neowave
2005
Neo Geo Battle Coliseum
Samurai Shodown VI (Samurai Spirits: Tenkaichi Kenkakuden)
The King of Fighters XI
2006
Metal Slug 6

Taito

Taito Type X
2008
The King of Fighters '98: Ultimate Match
2010
KOF Sky Stage

Taito Type X2
2007
KOF: Maximum Impact Regulation A
2008
Samurai Shodown: Edge of Destiny (Samurai Spirits Sen)
2009
The King of Fighters 2002: Unlimited Match
The King of Fighters XII
2010
The King of Fighters XIII

Taito Type X3
2017
The King of Fighters XIV
2018
SNK Heroines: Tag Team Frenzy
2019
Samurai Shodown (2019)

Other

SI Electronics System Board Y2
2009
The King of Fighters 2002: Unlimited Match

IGS PGM2 (PolyGame Master 2)
2009
The King of Fighters '98: Ultimate Match Hero

Sony

PlayStation
Double Dragon
Fatal Fury: Wild Ambition
Galaxy Fight: Universal Warriors
The King of Fighters '95
The King of Fighters '96
The King of Fighters '97
The King of Fighters '98
The King of Fighters '99
The King of Fighters: Kyo
Athena: Awakening from the Ordinary Life
Koudelka
The Last Blade
Magical Drop III
Metal Slug
Metal Slug X
Money Idol Exchanger
Real Bout Fatal Fury
Real Bout Fatal Fury Special: Dominated Mind (Real Bout Garou Densetsu Special: Dominated Mind)
Samurai Shodown 1+2
Samurai Shodown III: Blades of Blood
Samurai Shodown IV Special
Samurai Shodown IV: Amakusa's Revenge
Samurai Shodown: Warriors Rage (Samurai Shodown Shinshou)
Samurai Shodown RPG
Viewpoint
Voltage Fighter Gowcaizer

PlayStation 2
Art of Fighting Anthology
Fatal Fury Battle Archives Vol. 1
Fatal Fury Battle Archives Vol. 2
Garou: Mark of the Wolves
The King of Fighters '94 Re-Bout
The King of Fighters '98: Ultimate Match
The King of Fighters 2000
The King of Fighters 2001
The King of Fighters 2002
The King of Fighters 2002: Unlimited Match
The King of Fighters 2003
The King of Fighters XI
The King of Fighters Orochi Collection
KOF: Maximum Impact
KOF: Maximum Impact 2
Metal Slug Anthology
Metal Slug 3
Metal Slug 4
Metal Slug 5
Metal Slug 6
Neo Geo Battle Coliseum
Pochi and Nyaa
Samurai Shodown V
Samurai Shodown VI
Samurai Shodown Anthology
SNK Arcade Classics Vol. 1
SNK vs. Capcom: SVC Chaos
Sunsoft Collection
World Heroes Anthology

PlayStation Portable
The King of Fighters Collection: The Orochi Saga
Metal Slug Anthology
Metal Slug XX
Neo Geo Heroes: Ultimate Shooting
Samurai Shodown Anthology
SNK Arcade Classics Vol. 0
SNK Arcade Classics Vol. 1
Strikers 1945 Plus

PlayStation 3
The King of Fighters XII
The King of Fighters XIII

PlayStation 4
The King of Fighters XIV
SNK Heroines: Tag Team Frenzy
The King of Fighters '98: Ultimate Match
The King of Fighters 2002: Unlimited Match
SNK 40th Anniversary Collection
Metal Slug XX
Samurai Shodown (2019)
Samurai Shodown Neo Geo Collection
The King of Fighters XV

PlayStation 5
The King of Fighters XV

Nintendo

Game Boy
Dexterity (Funny Field)
The King of Fighters '95
The King of Fighters '96
Real Bout Fatal Fury Special
Samurai Shodown (1993 video game)
Samurai Shodown III
World Heroes 2
Money Idol Exchanger

Game Boy Advance
The King of Fighters EX: Neo Blood
The King of Fighters EX2: Howling Blood
Metal Slug Advance

Nintendo DS
Doki Doki Majo Shinpan!
 Doki Doki Majo Shinpan! 2 DUO 
Doki Majo Plus
Metal Slug 7
SNK vs. Capcom: Card Fighters DS

Famicom / NES
Alpha Mission
Athena
Baseball Stars
Crystalis
Fighting Golf
Guerrilla War
Ikari Warriors
Ikari Warriors II: Victory Road
Ikari Warriors III: The Rescue
Iron Tank
Little League Baseball: Championship Series
Mechanized Attack
P.O.W.: Prisoners of War
Satomi Hakkenden (Japan only)
Touchdown Fever

Super NES
Art of Fighting
Art of Fighting 2
Fatal Fury: King of Fighters
Fatal Fury 2
Fatal Fury Special
King of the Monsters
King of the Monsters 2
Magical Drop II
Samurai Shodown (1993 video game)
Sengoku Denshou
Super Baseball 2020
World Heroes (video game)
World Heroes 2

Wii
The King of Fighters Collection: The Orochi Saga
Metal Slug Anthology
Samurai Shodown Anthology
SNK Arcade Classics Vol. 1

Nintendo Switch
SNK Heroines: Tag Team Frenzy
SNK 40th Anniversary Collection
Samurai Shodown (2019)
Samurai Shodown Neo Geo Collection
Neo Geo Pocket Color Selection Vol. 1

Sega

Sega CD
Fatal Fury Special
Samurai Shodown (1993 video game)
Sengoku Denshou

Sega Dreamcast
Cool Cool Toon
Garou: Mark of the Wolves
The King of Fighters: Dream Match '99
The King of Fighters: Evolution
The King of Fighters 2000
The King of Fighters 2001
The King of Fighters 2002
Nakoruru: Ano Hito kara no Okurimono
The Last Blade 2
Twinkle Star Sprites

Sega Game Gear
Fatal Fury Special
Samurai Shodown (1993 video game)

Sega Genesis
Art of Fighting
Fatal Fury: King of Fighters
Fatal Fury 2
King of the Monsters
King of the Monsters 2
Samurai Shodown
Street Smart
Super Baseball 2020
Viewpoint
World Heroes

Sega Saturn
Fatal Fury 3: Road to the Final Victory
Galaxy Fight: Universal Warriors
The King of Fighters '95
The King of Fighters '96
The King of Fighters '97
The King of Fighters Best Collection
Magical Drop II
Magical Drop III
Metal Slug
Ragnagard
Real Bout Fatal Fury
Real Bout Fatal Fury Best Collection
Real Bout Fatal Fury Special
Samurai Shodown III: Blades of Blood
Samurai Shodown IV: Amasuka's Revenge
Samurai Shodown RPG
Stakes Winner 2
Twinkle Star Sprites
Waku Waku 7
World Heroes Perfect

Panasonic, Sanyo & Goldstar

3DO
Samurai Shodown

NEC

TurboGrafx 16 / Turbo Duo
Art of Fighting
Fatal Fury 2
Fatal Fury Special
World Heroes 2

Microsoft

Xbox
The King of Fighters 2002
The King of Fighters 2003
The King of Fighters Neowave
KOF: Maximum Impact Maniax
Metal Slug 3
Metal Slug 4
Metal Slug 5
Samurai Shodown V
SNK vs. Capcom: SVC Chaos

Xbox 360
Fatal Fury Special (via Xbox Live Arcade)
Garou: Mark of the Wolves (via Xbox Live Arcade)
The King of Fighters '98: Ultimate Match (via Xbox Live Arcade)
The King of Fighters 2002: Unlimited Match (via Xbox Live Arcade)
The King of Fighters XII
The King of Fighters XIII
KOF Sky Stage (via Xbox Live Arcade)
Metal Slug 3 (via Xbox Live Arcade)
Metal Slug XX (via Xbox Live Arcade)
Neo Geo Battle Coliseum (via Xbox Live Arcade)
Samurai Shodown II (via Xbox Live Arcade)
Samurai Shodown Sen
Trouble Witches Neo! (via Xbox Live Arcade)

Xbox One
SNK 40th Anniversary Collection
Samurai Shodown (2019)
Samurai Shodown Neo Geo Collection

Xbox Series X/S
Samurai Shodown (2019)
The King of Fighters XV

PC

Windows
Fatal Fury 3: Road to the Final Victory
Metal Slug Collection PC
The King of Fighters: Evolution
Samurai Shodown II
Money Idol Exchanger

Microsoft Store
3 Count Bout
Aero Fighters 2
Aero Fighters 3
Aggressors of Dark Kombat
Alpha Mission II
Art of Fighting
Art of Fighting 2
Art of Fighting 3: The Path of the Warrior
Blue's Journey
Burning Fight
Crossed Swords
Cyber-Lip
Fatal Fury: King of Fighters
Fatal Fury 2
Fatal Fury 3: Road to the Final Victory
Fatal Fury Special
Galaxy Fight: Universal Warriors
Ghost Pilots
Gururin
Karnov's Revenge
The King of Fighters '94
The King of Fighters '95
The King of Fighters '96
The King of Fighters '99
The King of Fighters 2001
The King of Fighters 2003
The King of Fighters XV
King of the Monsters
King of the Monsters 2
Kizuna Encounter
The Last Blade
The Last Blade 2
Last Resort
League Bowling
Magician Lord
Magical Drop II
Magical Drop III
Metal Slug
Metal Slug 4
Metal Slug 5
Money Puzzle Exchanger
Mutation Nation
NAM-1975
Neo Turf Masters
Ninja Combat
Ninja Commando
Ninja Master's
Over Top
Power Spikes II
Pulstar
Puzzle Bobble
Puzzle Bobble 2
Puzzled
Ragnagard
Real Bout Fatal Fury
Real Bout Fatal Fury Special
Riding Hero
Robo Army
Samurai Shodown
Samurai Shodown II
Samurai Shodown III
Samurai Shodown IV
Samurai Shodown V
Savage Reign
Sengoku
Sengoku 2
Spinmaster
Stakes Winner
Stakes Winner 2
Street Slam
Strikers 1945 Plus
Super Baseball 2020
Super Sidekicks
The Super Spy
Top Hunter: Roddy & Cathy
Twinkle Star Sprites
Waku Waku 7
World Heroes
World Heroes 2
World Heroes 2 Jet
World Heroes Perfect
Zed Blade
ZuPaPa!

Steam
Baseball Stars 2
Garou: Mark of the Wolves
The King of Fighters '97 Global Match
The King of Fighters '98: Ultimate Match Final Edition
The King of Fighters 2002: Unlimited Match
The King of Fighters XIII Steam Edition
The King of Fighters XIV Steam Edition
The King of Fighters XV
The Last Blade
The Last Blade 2
Metal Slug
Metal Slug 2
Metal Slug 3
Metal Slug X
Metal Slug XX
Metal Slug Defense
Neo Geo Pocket Color Selection Vol. 1
SNK 40th Anniversary Collection
SNK Heroines: Tag Team Frenzy
Samurai Shodown V Special
Samurai Shodown Neo Geo Collection
Samurai Shodown (2019)
Shock Troopers
Shock Troopers: 2nd Squad
Twinkle Star Sprites

Humble Bundle
Art of Fighting 2
Baseball Stars 2
Blazing Star
Fatal Fury Special
Garou: Mark of the Wolves
Ironclad
The King of Fighters 2000
The King of Fighters 2002: Challenge To Ultimate Battle
The Last Blade
Metal Slug
Metal Slug 2
Metal Slug 3
Metal Slug X
Neo Turf Masters
Pulstar
Real Bout Fatal Fury 2: The Newcomers
Samurai Shodown II
Samurai Shodown V Special
Sengoku 3
Shock Troopers
Shock Troopers: 2nd Squad
Twinkle Star Sprites

Epic Games Store
Samurai Shodown (2019)
Samurai Shodown Neo Geo Collection
The King of Fighters XV

Mobile phones
Blazing Star
Fatal Fury Special
Garou: Mark of the Wolves
The King of Fighters-A 2012
The King of Fighters-i 2012
The King of Fighters '97
The King of Fighters '98
Metal Slug
Metal Slug 2
Metal Slug 3
Metal Slug X
Metal Slug Attack
Metal Slug Defense
Samurai Shodown II

References

External links

SNK
 
 
SNK